Anna Lang, née Nordqvist (Stockholm, 5 July 1874 – 12 December 1920) was a Swedish court harpist.

Life and work 
Lang was the daughter of the conductor of the Kungliga Hovkapellet, Conrad Nordqvist. She received the von Beskow scholarship in 1883, became a student at Royal College of Music, Stockholm 1887, and was a harpist at Hovkapellet from 1890 until her death in 1920.

She married her teacher, the harp composer Josef Lang in 1895; their daughter, Ingrid Lang-Fagerström (1897–1990), was also a harpist in Hovkapellet, the Swedish royal chapel orchestra until 1962. 

Anna Lang died on 12 December 1920 in Lidingö. She and her husband are buried in Lidingö cemetery.

See also 
 Charlotta Seuerling
 Marie Pauline Åhman

Sources 
Anna Lang, född Nordqvist i Adolf Lindgren och Nils Personne, Svenskt porträttgalleri (1897), volym XXI. Tonkonstnärer och sceniska artister
Profil på Hovkapellets webbplats.

References

Swedish harpists
1874 births
1920 deaths
Swedish women artists
19th-century Swedish musicians
19th-century Swedish women musicians